The 1992 Summer Olympics were held in Barcelona, Spain from July 25 to August 9.

{| id="toc" class="toc" summary="Contents"
|-
| style="text-align:center;" colspan="3"|Contents
|-
|
Aquatics
Archery
Athletics
Badminton
Baseball
Basketball
Boxing
Canoeing
Cycling
|valign=top|
Equestrian
Fencing
Field hockey
Football
Gymnastics
Handball
Judo
Modern pentathlon
Rowing
|valign=top|
Sailing
Shooting
Table tennis
Tennis
Volleyball
Weightlifting
Wrestling
|-
| style="text-align:center;" colspan="3"|References
|}


Aquatics

Diving

Swimming

* Swimmers who participated in the heats only and received medals.

Synchronized swimming

Water polo

Archery

Athletics

Track

Road

Field

Badminton

Baseball

Basketball

Boxing

Canoeing

Flatwater

Slalom

Cycling

Road

Track

Equestrian

Fencing

Field Hockey

Football

Gymnastics

Artistic

Rhythmic

Handball

Judo

Modern pentathlon

Rowing

Sailing

Shooting

Table tennis

Tennis

Volleyball

Weightlifting

Wrestling

Freestyle

Greco-Roman

Notes
 Ibragim Samadov of the Unified Team was disqualified after he threw his medal onto the podium and walked out of the medal ceremony. The IOC decided not to award the medal to fourth-place finisher Chon Chol Ho of North Korea, as Samadov's offence had not been committed in the context of the competition.

See also
 1992 Summer Olympics medal table

External links

Medalists
1992